Sahianwala is a village in Faisalabad District near Salarwala and M3 motorway. It has approximately a population of 1,500. It is located approximately 12 km from Chak No 14 Muradwala.

References 

Villages in Faisalabad District